"Akher Gharam" "(Last Love)" is the debut single from Lebanese singer Amal Hijazi, released from her debut album Akher Gharam released in 2001, which became her signature song during the early 2000s. The song was a major release of 2001 and a bought a major career countdown for Hijazi and increased the sales of her debut album. It peaked at number one in countries like Lebanon, Syria, Morocco, Tunisia and Jordan. In addition, it enjoyed significant success in the Persian Gulf region and was especially popular in the UAE, Bahrain and Qatar.

Directed by Tony Qahwaji and shot in Lebanon, music video is what arguably fueled the single to become a success. The video starts with Hijazi standing in a dusty pathway in a desert singing. The video was shot in various desert locations and at the end, Hijazi is seen dancing besides a haystack with a group of dancers.

2001 singles
Amal Hijazi songs
2001 songs